Pravat Tripathy is a leader of Biju Janata Dal and a member of Odisha Legislative Assembly.

References

Members of the Odisha Legislative Assembly
Indian prisoners and detainees
Living people
Year of birth missing (living people)
Biju Janata Dal politicians